Bill Morrow (born 1959) is the former CEO of the government-owned corporation nbn™ responsible for installation and implementation of the National Broadband Network across Australia. His departure was announced in April 2018 and became effective on 1 September 2018. He became CEO of Directv in February, 2022.

Career
1980 – 1995: Director, Network Data Products, Pacific Bell
1996 – 24 July 2006: Vodafone Group PLC, finishing as CEO Europe.
1 April 2005: appointed President of Vodafone UK
2006 – 2008: President and CEO of Pacific Gas and Electric Company
9 March 2009 – 10 March 2011: CEO of US telecommunications company Clearwire
21 March 2012 – March 2014: CEO, Vodafone Hutchison Australia (VHA)
 2 April 2014 – 1 Sept 2018: CEO NBN Co Australian National Broadband Network
 October 2019- February 2021: Special adviser and managing director of process service and cost optimization AT&T 
 February 2021: CEO of DirecTV

Education
Associate of Science degree in Electrical Engineering from Condie College, San Jose, California 
BA in Business Administration from National University in San Diego

References

1959 births
Living people
American businesspeople
Australian businesspeople
Vodafone people
NBN Co people